Castle Mountains may refer to:

 Castle Mountains (California) in California and Nevada, USA
 Castle Mountains (Montana) in Montana, USA